Richard Abelardo Abellon (died in 2008) was a Filipino Episcopalian bishop. He was a bishop in The Episcopal Church and the first Prime Bishop of the Episcopal Church in the Philippines, from 1990 to 1992.

References

2008 deaths
Bishops of the Episcopal Church (United States)
Filipino Episcopalians
Year of birth missing
Place of birth missing
Date of death missing
Place of death missing
Filipino bishops
Anglican bishops in the Philippines
Episcopal bishops of Northern Philippines
Prime bishops of the Episcopal Church in the Philippines
Episcopal bishops of Southern Philippines
Episcopal bishops of Northern Luzon
20th-century Anglican bishops in Asia